Peter Frank "Pete" Girard (May 5, 1918 – February 12, 2011) was a United States Army Air Forces pilot, Chief Engineering Test Pilot for Ryan Aeronautical, and the first man to hover in jet vertical flight. This feat was accomplished November 24, 1953 during tests that would culminate in the development of the Ryan X-13 Vertijet. He would later accomplish the first full-cycle vertical takeoff, horizontal flight, and vertical landing in a jet aircraft on April 11, 1957 at Edwards Air Force Base. Prior to working with Ryan, Girard had worked at Curtiss-Wright in St. Louis, Missouri and served in the United States Army Air Corps during World War II as a Consolidated B-24 Liberator pilot.

Early life and USAAC
Born in 1918 in Monterey, California, Girard was raised on a cattle ranch, first in Cachagua and then in Tularcitos, in the Carmel Valley near the Central Coast of California. Girard was a graduate of the University of California, Berkeley with a degree in mechanical engineering, class of 1940. While working at Curtiss-Wright he joined a cadre of like-minded engineers who learned to fly in gliders purchased by the group. During World War II Girard enlisted in what was then the United States Army Air Corps, and advanced through flight training becoming a multi-engine heavy bomber pilot flying B-24s. He mustered out of the Air Corps as a Second Lieutenant at San Bernardino, California.

Chief Engineering Test Pilot

After his military service Girard found employment at Ryan Aeronautical in San Diego, initially in the metallurgical department, then as Chief of the Physical Test Section of the Engineering Laboratories, and later as their Chief Engineering Test Pilot. During this time Girard attended the 10th class of the United States Naval Test Pilot School at Naval Air Station Patuxent River, graduating second in his class of 36 as a civilian among military pilots. This prepared him to test a variety of new-concept designs including the Ryan X-13 Vertijet and the Ryan VZ-3 Vertiplane, and he performed test flights at various airfields including Edwards Air Force Base in the Mojave Desert. By this time specializing in vertical and short-take off aircraft (V/STOL), his most notable moment occurred on July 29, 1957: While demonstrating the capabilities of the X-13, he landed vertically before an audience of some 3,000 officers and journalists at the steps of The Pentagon. After twelve years as Chief Engineering Test Pilot, he then served as Chief of Aerodynamics and Chief of Preliminary Design, finally retiring as Chief of Advanced Products for Aircraft Engineering, where he was responsible for the design of remotely piloted air vehicles and other technical innovations. His experiences are recounted in the book Jet Pioneers (Grover Heiman, 1963 Van Rees Press, NY, Chapter 10, "Hanging on Hot Air"), and a segment produced by The History Channel entitled "Secret Superpower Aircraft: Quest for Vertical Take-Off". The X-13, with Girard in the pilot seat, was featured on the cover of the May 20, 1957 issue of Life magazine. The two X-13 aircraft constructed are now in aviation museums; one in the San Diego Air & Space Museum and the other in the National Museum of the United States Air Force at Wright-Patterson Air Force Base in Dayton, Ohio. Girard continued his activities in vertical flight and other areas, and was awarded more than thirty patents both at Ryan Aeronautical and after retirement. His last patent was obtained just a few years before his death.

Other activities
Girard’s passion for flight carried over into his personal life. He owned and fabricated sailplanes and experimental aircraft, continued to privately test small aircraft into his sixties, and would design and fabricate prototype components for ultralight aircraft and other unique air vehicles both on his own and in collaboration with others such as Ryan Aeronautical founder Tubal Claude Ryan. His marriage proposal to his wife of more than fifty years, Leslie Girard (née Gehres, daughter of rear admiral Leslie E. Gehres of the USS Franklin), was made aboard a sailplane off the Torrey Pines gliderport.

Girard was the author of at least seven published technical papers, and in 1963 he was awarded the I.B. Laskowitz Gold Medal by the New York Academy of Sciences for a technical paper on VTOL flight. He was an Associate Fellow of the American Institute of Aeronautics and Astronautics and a member of the American Helicopter Society, the Soaring Society of America, and the Associated Glider Club of Southern California, and was a Registered Professional Engineer in the State of California.

Patents
Peter F. Girard, professional engineer of California, had more than 30 patents approved.
 1961: US3025022 Filed: Jan 16, 1961. Delta Wing Heliplane
 1962: US3135483 Filed: August 20, 1962. Auxiliary Boom Control System for Rogallo Type Wing Aircraft
 1962: US3135482 Filed: December 26, 1962. Flexible Wing STOL Assist System for Aircraft
 1963: US3152778 Filed: Feb 25, 1963. Articulated Spreader Bar Lateral Control System for Flexible Wing Aircraft
 1963: US3155341 Filed: Apr 5, 1963. Convertiplane
 1963: US3146970 Filed: July 1, 1963. Heliplane
 1963: US3306559 Filed: November 4, 1963. Roll Control System for Flexible Wing Aircraft
 1963: US3203649 Filed: Dec 23, 1963. Rotor Flap High Lift System
 1964: US3159360 Filed: Jan 20, 1964. Jet Powered VTOL Aircraft. Co-inventor with Tubal Claude Ryan.
 1964: US3273827 Filed: Apr 27, 1964. Propeller-rotor High Lift System for Aircraft
 1964: US3269674 Filed: June 26, 1964.  Flexible Wing With Pitch Stabilizing Means
 1964: US3223361 Filed: Oct 5, 1964. Flexible Wing with Integrated Tail Unit
 1965: USD203523 Filed: Apr 12, 1965. Rotary Wing VTOL Aircraft with Tiltable Secondary Wing. This is an ornamental appearance design patent.
 1965: USD203524 Filed: Apr 19, 1965. Tandem Wing VTOL Aircraft. This is an ornamental appearance design patent.
 1965: US3273655 Filed: Aug 2, 1965. Center Body Pivotally Retractable Rotor
 1966: US3361388 Filed: March 7, 1966. Demountable Aircraft with Flexible Wing
 1966: US3401906 Filed: May 3, 1966. Gyrochute
 1966: US3381919 Filed: Jul 25, 1966. Flexible Wing Aerial Delivery System
 1966: USD211215 Filed: Dec 16, 1966. STOL Utility Aircraft as ornamental appearance design patent.
 1967: US3464650 Filed: Oct 18, 1967. Aircraft with Flapped Rotor/Wing
 1968: US3490720 Filed: Nov 26, 1968. STOL AIRCRAFT WITH VARIABLE GEOMETRY ROTOR/WING
 1970: US3675582 Filed: Aug 5, 1970. Mass Transportation System
 1970: US3703998 Filed: Dec 28, 1970. Drone Aircraft with Telescopic Fuselage
 1972: USD230961 Filed: May 22, 1972.  Airplane. Co-inventor: T. Claude Ryan. Ornamental appearance design patent.
 1972: US3827661 Filed: Jul 26, 1972.  Aircraft Wing Structure and Method of Assembly. Co-inventor: T. Claude Ryan. 
 1972: US3794273 Filed: Sep 25, 1972. VTOL Rotor Wing Drone Aircraft
 1972: US3792827 Filed: Nov 10, 1972. VTOL Aircraft with Cruciform Rotor
 1975: US3986686 Filed: Jun 2, 1975. Aircraft with Retractable Rotor Wing

References 

Heiman, Grover, "Jet Pioneers", 1963, Van Rees Press, NY
Wagner, William, "Ryan, the Aviator", 1971, McGraw-Hill, NY
Life magazine, May 20, 1957
SD Evening Tribune, April 13, 1957, page A-1, "Vertijet Soars, Flies Level in Full Test"
SD Evening Tribune, Final Edition, April 13, 1957, page A-1, "Ryan First: Vertijet Rises, Then Levels Off"
SD Evening Tribune, May 9, 1957, page A-1, "Fist Photos of New Ryan Plane: Up! Up! Goes the Vertijet: Builders Give Description of Stubby Craft"
SD Evening Tribune, May 10, 1957, page A-1, "Ryan Bares Details on Vertijet Plane"
SD Union, May 10, 1957, page A-1, "New Air Warfare Concept Opened by Ryan's Vertijet"
SD Union-Tribune, Feb 17, 2011, page B-4, "Ryan Engineer Famed As Test Pilot, First to Fly Vertical-Takeoff Jet"
Carmel Valley News, May 24, 1957 "From Ranch to Ryan"

External links 
 Smithsonian National Air & Space Museum article on the X-13
 

1918 births
2011 deaths
American test pilots
People from Monterey, California
People from Carmel Valley Village, California
United States Army Air Forces bomber pilots of World War II
University of California, Berkeley alumni
Military personnel from California